HMAS Carpentaria is a former Royal Australian Navy (RAN) base that was located on Thursday Island, part of the Torres Strait Islands in Queensland, Australia. As of May 1945, three of the twenty Australian Rendering Mines Safe (RMS) personnel were located at Carpentaria.

See also
List of former Royal Australian Navy bases

References

Carpentaria
Carpentaria
Carpentaria
Buildings and structures in Far North Queensland